The Noise Company is an American independent record label and music management company based in Austin, TX. The label was founded in 2007 by recording artist Ben Kweller. In 2009, Kweller stated in an Australian magazine that he recently parted ways with his long-time label-home, ATO Records in order to start a new company to release his music and help other artists. Over the years, NoiseCo (as it is often called) has grown from being a label, to an all-encompassing entertainment company that focuses on many aspects of its clients' careers. The Noise Company LLC was incorporated on January 22, 2011.

Artists 
 Amy Cook
 Ben Kweller
 Little Dan
 Modern Love Child
 Radish
 The Get You
 Wild Child

References 

 The Beat / Ben Kweller
 The Washington Post / Changing horses (The Noise Co./ATO)
 Watch Out For... / Ben Kweller

Record labels established in 2007